Throughout 2022, between February and November, areas of the United Kingdom experienced significant flooding. The first wave of flooding occurred in February as Storm Franklin caused severe disruption across the country.

Later in the year, in August, a flood had caused damage in Devon and Cornwall. Heavy rain caused flooding in Dorset in October whilst another wave occurred in November, affecting many parts of England and Scotland. At least two to three weeks worth of rain fell in Scotland in a twenty-four hour period on 18 November.

February flooding 

Storm Franklin caused significant disruption in parts of the United Kingdom in February 2022 as a result of severe flooding which caused power outages and property damage across the country.

August flooding 

Parts of Devon and Cornwall were affected. Flood water covered the Tregolls roundabout in Truro. In Dorset, numerous properties in Bridport, Burton Bradstock and West Bay were flooded out. Flooding was also experienced in Worksop in Nottinghamshire. In Lincolnshire, Market Rasen experienced historic flooding. Parts of Leicestershire affected included Leicester, Loughborough and Thurmaston. London was affected too, with flooding in Bloomsbury, St Pancras station, Victoria and Kentish Town. Roads in Port Talbot in South Wales were submerged. In Essex, flash floods affected Epping Forest, Chelmsford, Braintree and Halstead.

October flooding 
After heavy rains on 21 October, Bournemouth Town Centre was hit by heavy flash flooding.

November flooding 

On 15 November, heavy rain caused flooding across England and Wales. In west Wales, more than 50 homes near Tenby lost electricity. As the weather moved further inland, 70 homes were blacked out near Nottingham, 86 at Loughborough, 70 near Coventry, 30 near Wolverhampton and almost 50 in Boston. A section of the Devon Expressway near Plymouth was flooded. In Wiltshire, flood warnings were made for the River Biss at Trowbridge and Westbury, there is also alerts for the River Cole and Dorcan Brook in east Swindon, and the Upper Bristol Avon area, which covers Chippenham, Melksham, Lyneham, Malmesbury and Royal Wootton Bassett. In Chesham a burst pipe caused flooding in the town centre. In Sussex Victoria Gardens in Brighton flooded. Trains were delayed between Three Bridges and Haywards Heath as a result of a flooded tunnel.

Between 17 and 19 November, heavy rain caused flooding in parts of Scotland with several amber warnings being put in place as a result. The flooding caused disruption on transportation. Schools closed in Angus as a result of the flooding and emergency rest centres were set up in Aberdeenshire.

On 25 November 2022, the Met Office issued a yellow warning for Southern England and Southern Wales for rain from 26 to 27 November 2022, where downpours could are likely to cause flooding.

December flooding 
On 20 December, there was a number of roads flooded in Dorset, after heavy rain impacted the River Frome, River Wriggle and River Stour.

On 30 December, Scotland was hit by severe flooding. Dumfries was impacted by heavy flooding.

Environmental impact 
The floods overwhelmed a pumping station operated by Southern Water which overflowed causing discharge of sewage to leak onto roads and car park in Totton.

See also 
 2022 United Kingdom heatwaves

References 

Floods in the United Kingdom
February 2022 events in the United Kingdom
floods
October 2022 events in the United Kingdom
November 2022 events in the United Kingdom
2022 floods in the United Kingdom
Climate change in the United Kingdom